National Lampoon The Naked and The Nude: Hollywood and Beyond is a humor book that was published by Harmony Books in 1976 as a trade paperback. It was a spin-off of National Lampoon magazine.

The cover of the book says that it was "directed by" Brian McConnachie, an Emmy award-winning writer who was one of the major contributors to National Lampoon magazine.

References

 Amazon listing

National Lampoon books
1976 books